Texas Tech University Health Sciences Center at Amarillo (TTUHSC Amarillo) is a branch campus of Texas Tech University Health Sciences Center (TTUHSC) located in Amarillo, Texas.

The university exists in two locations in Amarillo: one housing the Laura W. Bush Institute for Women's Health and the Harrington Library of the Health Sciences, and the other housing the schools, clinics, and research facilities. The campus has been at its current location since 2002.

TTUHSC School of Medicine opened a regional campus in Amarillo in 1972. The School of Allied Health and School of Pharmacy opened in 1994 and 1996 respectively. The TTUHSC Amarillo serves as a regional campus to the School of Allied Health Sciences and the School of Medicine.

Unlike the other TTUHSC schools, the Amarillo campus, rather than the Lubbock campus, serves as the main campus for the School of Pharmacy.

External links
 Texas Tech University Health Sciences Center at Amarillo

Amarillo
Texas Tech University Health Sciences Center at Amarillo
Texas Tech University Health Sciences Center at Amarillo